Carr's Hill, also known as the University of Virginia President's House, is a historic home located near Charlottesville, Albemarle County, Virginia.  Carr's Hill was built in 1906, and is a two-story, five bay brick dwelling in the Colonial Revival style. It features a prominent double-height pedimented portico in the Doric order, a slate covered hipped roof, and two tall chimneys. It was designed by the prominent architectural firm of McKim, Mead & White.  The house overlooks the university chapel and the "Academical Village."  Also on the property are the contributing Guest Cottage, Buckingham Palace (1856), the Leake Cottage, carriage house (1908), the landscape (site), and two iron capitals (objects) that were salvaged from the ruins of the Robert Mills Rotunda Annex after the 1895 fire.

It was added to the National Register of Historic Places in 2008.

References

McKim, Mead & White buildings
Houses on the National Register of Historic Places in Virginia
Colonial Revival architecture in Virginia
Houses completed in 1906
Houses in Albemarle County, Virginia
National Register of Historic Places in Albemarle County, Virginia
1906 establishments in Virginia